Sitch may refer to:

Kim Possible: A Sitch in Time, a 2003 American animated TV film based on the Disney Channel animated television series Kim Possible
Michael Sorrentino, Jersey Shore star nicknamed "The Situation" and "Sitch"
 Robert Ian "Rob" Sitch, an Australian film director
 Sitch, a character from the manga One-Punch Man

See also
 Stitch (disambiguation)